Clark Glacier is an  long glacier located on Mount Abbe in Glacier Bay National Park and Preserve in the U.S. state of Alaska. It was named by W. O. Field and W. S. Cooper in 1936 for Johns Hopkins University professor of geology William Bullock Clark (1860–1917).

See also
 List of glaciers in the United States

References

Glaciers of Glacier Bay National Park and Preserve
Glaciers of Hoonah–Angoon Census Area, Alaska
Glaciers of Unorganized Borough, Alaska